Brorphine is a piperidine-based opioid analgesic compound. Brorphine was originally discovered in a 2018 paper investigating functionally biased opioid compounds, with the intention of finding safer analgesics that produce less respiratory depression than typical opioids. Brorphine was originally reported to be highly biased, with an EC50 of 4.8nM for GTPγS binding and 182nM for β-arrestin recruitment, however a more recent study found no significant bias for any of the compounds tested, including brorphine. Its safety profile in any animal model has never been established. Despite the lack of safety information on the compound, brorphine has been sold as a designer drug since mid-2019, initially being identified in the US Midwest, though it has since been found in 2020 in Belgium. It is related in chemical structure to compounds such as benzylfentanyl and bezitramide, though it is sufficiently structurally distinct to fall outside the formal definition of a "fentanyl analogue" in jurisdictions such as the US and New Zealand which have Markush structure controls over this family of drugs.

Brorphine was first identified in the U.S. recreational drug supply in July 2020 by the Center for Forensic Science Research and Education (CFSRE) through its NPS Discovery program; however, earlier identifications by the Drug Enforcement Administration (DEA) may have come as early as late 2019. The rise of brorphine in the U.S. can be directly linked to the decline of isotonitazene due to scheduling by the DEA. Brorphine was first implicated in 20 deaths in the U.S., primarily in cases originating from midwest states. Brorphine was commonly found with fentanyl and flualprazolam, a drug combination verified by drug product testing. Brorphine has also been identified in counterfeit opioid pills and tablets. Recently data from CFSRE and NMS Labs show that brorphine has been detected in more than 100 cases as of October 2020.

Legality 
Brorphine is not controlled under the Single Convention on Narcotic Drugs from 1961, however could be illegal to sell, to produce, to possess or to consume it in several countries of is sold for human consumption or under the Analogue Acts.
In the United States, Brorphine was placed into temporary emergency schedule I for 2 years by the DEA on January 4th, 2021 On February 3rd 2023, the DEA filed plans in the federal register for permanent placement of Brorphine into schedule I. Prior to this it's possible Brorphine may be considered a structural or functional analog of other schedule 1 or 2 substances if intended for human consumption under the Federal Analogue Act

In the United Kingdom, Brorphine would likely be considered illegal as a psychoactive substance under the Psychoactive Substances Act 2016 blanket ban.

See also 
 AH-7921
 Bezitramide
 Cebranopadol
 Diphenpipenol
 DPI-3290
 Etazen
 GSK1702934A
 J-113,397
 Oliceridine
 PZM21
 SR-16435
 SR-17018
 List of fentanyl analogues

References 

Analgesics
Designer drugs
Opioids
Benzimidazoles